Air Commodore Jayne Millington (11 January 1962 – 20 May 2017) was an air defence specialist with the Royal Air Force who was deputy chief of staff at NATO Allied Air Command in Germany after which she became UK national military representative at Supreme Headquarters Allied Powers Europe (SHAPE) in Belgium. She was closely involved with the ThrustSSC land speed record attempt.

References

1962 births
2017 deaths
People from Chester
English people of Welsh descent
Royal Air Force air commodores
20th-century Royal Air Force personnel
21st-century Royal Air Force personnel
Military personnel from Chester